Zhenbei Road is a station on Line 13 of the Shanghai Metro. It is located in the Putuo District of Shanghai.

Although service did not include mobile or Wi-Fi signals, the metro did provide stops to five stations in Jiading District.

References 

Railway stations in Shanghai
Shanghai Metro stations in Putuo District
Railway stations in China opened in 2012
Line 13, Shanghai Metro